David J. Swarts (born March 13, 1947) was the Commissioner of the New York State Department of Motor Vehicles, in the Cabinet of Gov. David Paterson. He was appointed to this position by former Gov. Eliot Spitzer on Dec. 21, 2006 and took office on Jan. 1, 2007, when the Spitzer Administration took office. He continued in the Paterson Administration after Gov. Spitzer resigned from office amid a sex scandal on March 17, 2008.

On January 13, 2011, the Buffalo and Erie County Botanical Gardens Society Inc. announced that Swarts will serve as the new president/chief executive officer. He will be responsible for administering and overseeing daily operations. In addition, he will implement the newly created Strategic Plan. His annual salary is $89,000 in this role.
 
Swarts is a former County Clerk of Erie County, New York, a position he held for 20 years. He was first elected County Clerk in 1986. He was the unsuccessful Democratic Nominee for Erie County Executive in 1983 and unsuccessfully sought the Democratic nomination for Erie County Executive in 1995. In 1988, he unsuccessfully ran for the U.S. House of Representatives. As County Clerk, he was in charge of receiving court filings, recording and preserving land transactions, issuing passports, overseeing the distribution of various permits and serving as the county's motor vehicles agent. In his as the county's motor vehicles agent, Swarts administered all DMV activities in Erie County on behalf of the Department of Motor Vehicles. While County Clerk, Swarts focused a lot of attention on the ending of tolls on highways surrounding Buffalo, New York.

In September 2007, Swarts and Gov. Spitzer developed a plan to issue driver's licenses to illegal immigrants. The plan was the subject of much debate on the state and national level, and was ultimately scrapped.

External links
  Statement from DMV Commissioner David Swarts
  Driver's license change to include illegal immigrants

References 

<https://web.archive.org/web/20121106005652/http://www.highbeam.com/doc/1P2-23119694.html>

Living people
Politicians from Buffalo, New York
Eliot Spitzer
State cabinet secretaries of New York (state)
1947 births